Maccabi Ground, Petah Tikva was a football stadium in Petah Tikva, on Stampfer street. The ground was in use between 1926 and 1975 and was abandoned when the lot was given to the Petah Tikva municipality and was built over.

See also
List of football stadiums in Israel

References

Defunct football venues in Israel
Maccabi Petah Tikva F.C.
Sports venues in Petah Tikva